"L'altra dimensione" is a song by Italian group Måneskin. It was included in their debut album Il ballo della vita and released as a single on 10 April 2019 by Sony Music.

Music video
The music video for "L'altra dimensione", directed by Antonio Usbergo and Niccolò Celaia, premiered on 11 April 2019 via Måneskin's YouTube channel.

Charts

Certifications

References

2018 songs
2019 singles
Italian-language songs
Måneskin songs
Sony Music singles
Songs written by Damiano David
Songs written by Victoria De Angelis